Baranovo is a rural locality (a village) in Chernushinsky District, Perm Krai, Russia. The population was 33 as of 2010. There are 2 streets.

Geography 
Baranovo is located 16 km east of Chernushka (the district's administrative centre) by road. Bolshoy Ulyk and Nizhny Kozmyash are the nearest rural localities.

References 

Rural localities in Chernushinsky District